The Basilica di San Gavino (Basilica of Saint Gabinus) is a proto-Romanesque church in Porto Torres, Sardinia, Italy.  A former cathedral, it is now a place for the veneration of local martyrs and a parish church.

History
Turris Libisonis (Latin: Turris Libyssonis, present day: Porto Torres) was a bishopric seat from 489 until 1441, when the see was moved to nearby Sassari. The basilica is located in the Monte Angellu section of Porto Torres; an area where archaeological excavations have found a Paleo-Christian necropolis and two ancient basilicas, dating to the 5th – 7th centuries AD; one of which was built over the tomb of Saint Gabinus whose remains are interred in the present church.

The earliest known document mentioning the church dates to 1065. According to it, the church was founded in the early 11th century by Gonario I, giudice (duke) of Torres and Arborea, who commissioned the work to Pisan masters. The construction continued under his son Barisone I, and was inaugurated by the giudice Marianus I of Arborea and archbishop Constantine of Castra in 1080.

An epigraph in the Romanesque portal testifies restoration work in the 15th century, which introduced Catalan-Gothic elements.

In the 18th century the crypt was renovated to house the remains of Torres' martyrs found in 1614.

Description

Exterior
The church is located between two courtyards, known as atrio Comita and atrio Metropoli. In the southern side is the main entrance, a 15th-century portal in Catalan Gothic style. It is surmounted by a rounded arch supported by two columns, whose capitals have angels with coats of arms. 

The church has two apses, one on each shorter side of the rectangular plan. The exterior is decorated by blind columns and Lombard bands. The ceiling is covered with lead plates.

Interior
The interior has a nave and two aisles separated by two series of rounded arches which are supported by twenty-two columns, taken from ancient edifices, in gray marble and pink granite, and three pairs of cruciform pilasters. Most of the capitals are of Roman origin. The nave is some three time wider than the aisles, and is covered by wooden trusses; the aisles have instead cross vaults.

The high altar, which until the 19th century was in the middle of the nave, is now in the south-western apse; the opposing apse has a wooden catafalque of the 17th century, housing polychrome statues of the martyrs Gabinus, Protus and Ianuarius.

The aisles led to the anti-crypt, in Renaissance style with statues of martyrs, and the crypt, which houses ancient Roman sarcophagi; the latter in turn house remains attributed to the Turres' martyrs.

Sources

External links
Page at sardegnacultura.it 

Romanesque architecture in Sardinia
Former cathedrals in Italy
Basilica churches in Sardinia
Churches in the province of Sassari